Throat Full of Glass is an EP by aggrotech band Combichrist. It is the second track to be released from the 2010 album Making Monsters.

Track listing

Music video
On 14 February with the release of the "Throat Full of Glass" single, the video was also released. The American copy of the single has the "Clean" version of the video. The European copy contains the 'Dirty' version depicting mild nudity and graphic violence.

References

External links
http://www.combichrist.com/ - Combichrist official website
http://www.myspace.com/combichrist - Combichrist official Myspace

2011 EPs
Combichrist albums